Air Nippon operated the following domestic services at the time of merger with ANA on 1 April 2012:

Asia

Japan
Kantō
 Chiba Prefecture
 Narita - Narita International Airport Hub
 Tokyo
 Hachijōjima - Hachijojima Airport
 Miyakejima - Miyakejima Airport
 Ōshima - Oshima Airport
 Ōta (Special wards of Tokyo) - Haneda Airport Hub
Chūbu
 Aichi Prefecture
 Nagoya - Chubu International Airport
 Ishikawa Prefecture
 Komatsu - Komatsu Airport
 Wajima - Noto Airport
 Niigata Prefecture
 Niigata - Niigata Airport
 Toyama Prefecture
 Toyama - Toyama Airport
Kansai
 Hyōgo Prefecture
 Kobe
Kobe Airport
Osaka International Airport Hub
Osaka Prefecture
Osaka - Kansai International Airport Hub
Chūgoku
 Hiroshima Prefecture
 Hiroshima - Hiroshima Airport
 Okayama Prefecture
 Okayama - Okayama Airport
 Shimane Prefecture
 Ōnan/Hagi, Yamaguchi Prefecture - Iwami Airport
 Tottori Prefecture
 Tottori - Tottori Airport
 Yonago - Miho-Yonago Airport
 Yamaguchi Prefecture
 Yamaguchi-Ube - Yamaguchi Ube Airport
Tōhoku
 Akita Prefecture
 Akita - Akita Airport
 Ōdate-Noshiro - Odate-Noshiro Airport
 Fukushima Prefecture
 Fukushima - Fukushima Airport
 Miyagi Prefecture
 Sendai - Sendai Airport
 Yamagata Prefecture
 Shōnai - Shonai Airport
Hokkaidō
 Hokkaidō
 Asahikawa - Asahikawa Airport
 Hakodate - Hakodate Airport
 Kushiro - Kushiro Airport
 Monbetsu - Monbetsu Airport
 Nakashibetsu - Nakashibetsu Airport
 Ōzora - Memanbetsu Airport
 Rishiri Island - Rishiri Airport
 Sapporo - New Chitose Airport
 Sapporo - Okadama Airport
 Wakkanai - Wakkanai Airport
Shikoku
 Ehime Prefecture
 Matsuyama - Matsuyama Airport
 Kagawa Prefecture
 Takamatsu - Takamatsu Airport
 Kōchi Prefecture
 Kōchi - Kōchi Ryōma Airport
 Tokushima Prefecture
 Tokushima - Tokushima Airport
Kyūshū
 Fukuoka Prefecture
 Fukuoka - Fukuoka Airport
 Kagoshima Prefecture
 Kagoshima - Kagoshima Airport
 Kumamoto Prefecture
 Kumamoto - Kumamoto Airport
 Miyazaki Prefecture
 Miyazaki - Miyazaki Airport
 Nagasaki Prefecture
 Gotō-Fukue - Fukue Airport
 Nagasaki - Nagasaki Airport
 Tsushima Island - Tsushima Airport
 Ōita Prefecture
 Ōita - Oita Airport
 Okinawa Prefecture
 Ishigaki - Ishigaki Airport
 Miyakojima - Miyako Airport
 Naha, Okinawa Island - Naha Airport
 Saga Prefecture
 Saga - Saga Airport

Former international service
Air Nippon had international scheduled services to Taipei-Taoyuan and Kaohsiung; however, with the implementation of a new Japan-Taiwan air agreement, ANA since April 2008 has taken over flight operations between Japan and Taiwan.

References

Air Nippon